Slavery existed in the area which was later to become Oman from antiquity onward. Oman was united with Zanzibar from the 1690s until 1856, and was a significant center of the Indian Ocean slave trade from Zanzibar. Slavery was abolished in 1970.

Omani Empire

During the Omani Empire (1692-1856), Oman was a center of the Zanzibar slave trade. Slaves were trafficked from the Swahili coast of East Africa via Zanzibar to Oman. From Oman, the slaves were exported to the Arabian Peninsula and Persia.

A second route of slave trade existed, with people from both Africa and East Asia, who were smuggled to Jeddah in the Arabian Peninsula in connection to the Muslim pilgrimage, Hajj, to Mecca and Medina. These slaves were imported from the Hejaz to Oman.

Muscat and Oman

In 1856, the Omani Empire was divided into the Sultanate of Zanzibar (1856-1964) and Muscat and Oman (1856-1970), but the slave trade continued. Zanzibar nominally abolished the slave trade in 1876. In practice, however, the slave trade continued. 

The slave trade from Africa became smaller in the late 19th-century, but the slave trade from Hejaz continued. In the 1940s, a third slave trade route was noted, in which Balochis from Balochistan were shipped across the Persian Gulf, many of whom had sold themselves or their children to escape poverty.  

Female slaves were used as domestic servants and as concubines (sex slaves), while male slaves were primarily used within the pearl industry as pearl divers. In 1943, it was reported that Baloch girls were shipped via Oman to Mecca, where they were popular as concubines since Caucasian (Circassian) girls were no longer available, and were sold for $350-450.

Activism against slave trade

The British Empire, having signed the 1926 Slavery Convention, was obliged to fight slavery and slave trade in all land under direct or indirect control of the British Empire. Muscat and Oman was defined by the British as having a special relationship with the British Empire.  As was the case with the rest of the Gulf states, the British considered their control over the region insufficient to do something about the slavery and the slave trade. The British policy was therefore to assure the League of Nations that the region followed the same anti slavery treaties signed by the British, but in parallel prevent any international observations of the area, which would disprove these claims. 

In 1936, the British acknowledged to the League of Nations that there was still ongoing slavery and slave trade in Oman and Qatar, but claimed that it was limited, and that all slaves who sought asylum at British Agents Office in Sharjah were granted manumission.    In the 1940s, there were several suggestions made by the British to combat the slave trade and the slavery in the region, but none was considered enforceable.

Abolition

After World War II, there was a growing international pressure from the United Nations to end the slave trade.  In 1948, the United Nations declared slavery to be a crime against humanity in the Universal Declaration of Human Rights, after which the Anti-Slavery Society pointed out that there were about one million slaves in the Arabian Peninsula, which was a crime against the 1926 Slavery Convention, and demanded that the UN form a committee to handle the issue. 

Slavery was formally abolished in Oman in 1970.

See also
 Afro-Omanis
 Human_rights_in_Oman#Domestic workers
 History of slavery in the Muslim world
 History of concubinage in the Muslim world
 Slavery in Saudi Arabia
 Human trafficking in the Middle East

References

 Joel Quirk: The Anti-Slavery Project: From the Slave Trade to Human Trafficking
 Jerzy Zdanowski:  Speaking With Their Own Voices: The Stories of Slaves in the Persian Gulf
 C.W.W. Greenidge:  Slavery
 William Clarence-Smith: Islam and the Abolition of Slavery

Oman
Oman
Society of Oman
Islam and slavery